Ronnie Båthman and Rikard Bergh were the defending champions, but none competed this year.

Tomás Carbonell and Christian Miniussi won the title by defeating Christian Bergström and Magnus Gustafsson 6–4, 7–5 in the final.

Seeds

Draw

Draw

References

External links
 Official results archive (ATP)
 Official results archive (ITF)

Men's Doubles
Doubles